The Municipality  of Monaco is the only administrative division of the Principality of Monaco, and is coterminous with the state as a whole.

Political order
The municipal system is determined by the IX part of the Constitution of Monaco. The Municipality of Monaco has as its organ the city council made up of 15 members, who can also be present at the National Council. A little more than 7,000 Monegasque citizens are voters, while to be elected it is necessary to be 21 years old. The electoral system is a simple two-year plurinominal scrutiny: each elector has fifteen votes of preference that he can distribute to his pleasure among the possibly competing lists. The candidates who have been chosen by more than half of the voters are elected in the first round, while for the others the road of a second round is opened in which the most voted candidates are elected. The effect of this mechanism is hyper-major, configuring an assembly dominated by the first party of the principality, the Union Monégasque. The term of office is 4 years.

The council elects in its interior the mayor and his deputies, or the councilors. The political custom, however, makes sure that the candidate for the first city armchair is indirectly indicated by the voters in the figure of the list leader of the most voted list. The current mayor is Georges Marsan, who has been in office since 2003 and has come to the third re-election.

The functions of the municipality, active in social, cultural and civil life, do not differ substantially from those of the homologous bodies of neighboring nations, the French and Italian municipalities.

History
The ancient territory of the Principality was much larger than the present one, including also the towns of Roccabruna and Menton which, however, arose in the framework of the Italian Risorgimento, passed to France in 1860 leaving the capital, i.e. the Monegasque municipality, as the only common of the State.

The 1911 constitution divided the old Commune of Monaco into the three municipalities of Monaco City, Monte Carlo and La Condamine, but the prince's government was accused of having operated a form of dividend and imperat against the only democratic institution in the country, having on the other hand, the National Council has extremely limited powers. The controversy brought relatively quickly to the revision of the decision, restoring the single municipality with a law of 1917, operational from the following year. Since then the Monegasque territory is administratively undivided, and the city districts have only statistical purposes.

Today, the city hall of Monaco is based in place de la Mairie.

Quarters

References

Subdivisions of Monaco
France–Monaco border crossings